State Route 157 (SR 157) is a  state highway that travels south-to-north through portions of Chattooga, Walker, and Dade counties in the northwestern part of the U.S. state of Georgia.

Route description
SR 157 begins at an intersection with SR 48, northwest of Menlo, in the community of Cloudland, in Chattooga County. The road heads northeast into Walker County. It curves to the northwest and heads to the north-northeast. The highway has a brief foray into Dade County, before re-entering Walker County. Continuing on its north-northeast trek, it intersects SR 136, southeast of Cloudland Canyon State Park. SR 157 continues to the north-northeast and curves to the north-northwest to re-enter Dade County. The two routes run concurrent to the northeast. On the southwestern edge of Lookout Mountain, they cut across the eastern edge of Covenant College. They briefly run along the Dade–Walker county line, with SR 157 splitting off onto McFarland Road, back into Walker County. It briefly heads south on Lula Lake Road, before heading east on Red Riding Hood Trail. It curves to the northeast until it meets its northern terminus, Tennessee State Route 58, at the Tennessee state line. SR 157 is not part of the National Highway System.

Major intersections

See also

References

External links

 Georgia Roads (Routes 141 - 160)

157
Transportation in Chattooga County, Georgia
Transportation in Walker County, Georgia
Transportation in Dade County, Georgia